{{Infobox musical artist
| name              = The Virginia Gentlemen
| image             = The Virginia Gentlemen 19.jpg
| caption           = Group Photo, 2019
| background        = group_or_band
| alias             = The VGs
| origin            = University of Virginia
| genre             = A Cappella
| years_active      = 1953–present
| label             = Collegiate
| website           = Official Site
| current_members   = Class of 2023Patrick CloudDean BartonJosh BertrandWill BerglundClass of 2024Philip DiMeglioSamuel WellsLucas EspinosaClass of 2025Cooper DavenportStephen WiececkLex LongRocco AlbaneseDaniel NewlandsClass of 2026Brian CunninghamCavan MeadeRyan Poquis }}

The Virginia Gentlemen (VGs) is a lower voices collegiate a cappella group and the oldest a cappella group at the University of Virginia. The group was founded in 1953 as an elite octet of the Virginia Glee Club. Since establishing independence from the Virginia Glee Club in 1987, the group has continued to perform a mix of contemporary pop and classic vocal music.

Recognizable by the signature navy blue blazers and orange-and-blue bow ties worn during performances, the VGs offer regular performances across the Charlottesville area and the United States, and conduct annual international tours, having most recently traveled to Guatemala, Los Cabos and California. Additionally, the group has performed in recent years at the Sydney Opera House, the Forbidden City, the Grand Palace of Thailand, and at the White House for the Bush and Obama administrations.

About

Glee Club era and independence

The Virginia Gentlemen were founded in 1953 and are the oldest a cappella group at the University of Virginia. The group was conceived as an elite octet of the Virginia Glee Club and would perform regularly at their concerts, eventually building enough of a reputation to attract its own audiences and perform its own shows. The group existed for over three decades as a subsidiary of the Glee Club until establishing itself as a contracted independent organization in 1987, under the leadership of then-music director Michael Butterman. Still, the Virginia Gentlemen feature at Glee Club events like their annual Christmas Concert, as a nod to their roots.

Modern group
Since the VGs' independence from the Virginia Glee Club, much changed with the group, the least of which being the group's membership size. From the Glee Club era size of 8 to 12 members, the group now stands regularly between 13 and 17 members per year. The group's musical tastes changed as well, diverging from the classical and barbershop chorus pieces of the Glee Club era to arrangements of modern pop singles and rock ballads that it performs and records today.

The VGs maintain a close relationship with the University of Virginia and the city of Charlottesville, performing regularly on campus in concerts and for special occasions and memorials, including the vigil  for Yeardley Love after her death.

The group recorded its first album in 1988 with Live From the Studio and has since released 22 studio albums. The VGs most recent album release was in 2016 with Upside Down, a reference to their recent travel to Antarctica. Several Virginia Gentlemen arrangements have been featured on Best of College A Cappella compilations, including their renowned a cappella arrangement of the song "Insomniac" by Billy Pilgrim.

Activities

Performances

Concerts
The Virginia Gentlemen annually perform four concerts throughout the year, typically in Old Cabell Hall.  The first of these concerts is the Family Weekend Concert held as part of the events organized for the University's Family Weekend in the middle of the Fall semester. The second is the Holiday Concert held in conjunction with the Virginia Sil'hooettes in December. The third of these is the Winter Classic held in February, which at times has also been held in conjunction with the Hullabahoos and the Academical Village People. The fourth concert of the year is the Spring Concert, held in April. The proceeds from the Holiday Concert and, in recent years, the Winter Classic, are annually donated to charity.

The VGs also perform annually at the Annual Christmas Concert of the Virginia Glee Club in honor of the two groups' long-standing relationship.  Traditionally, when the Glee Club performs "The Twelve Days of Christmas," the eighth day is sung by the VGs, an homage to the original octet which formed out of the Glee Club.

At the White House
The group has received requests to perform in several prestigious venues, including the White House, at which the group performed in 1991 for George H. W. Bush, in 2008 for George W. Bush, and in 2011, 2012, and 2013 for Barack Obama, including for the 2013 Presidential Inauguration.

Annual international tours
The group has traveled extensively since its independence, beginning with regular tours around the country and to the Caribbean in the early years of independence. For the last decade and a half, the group has traveled on an annual international tour, most recently visiting New Zealand and Australia in March 2019. The Virginia Gentlemen have now traveled to all 7 continents, a feat that has been accomplished by very few performing groups. See their record of travel for more.

Traditions

Image and attire
The Virginia Gentlemen's standard performance attire consists of khakis, blue blazers, and blue and orange bow ties (the UVA colors), for which members of the group are widely recognized around campus. Indeed, several of the a cappella groups founded at the University of Virginia after the Virginia Gentlemen established their identities in response to the formal look taken by the Virginia Gentlemen at concerts. However, the group does not perform exclusively in "VG attire" but has performed more informally as suited by the occasion.

Signature songs
Over six decades, the Virginia Gentlemen have arranged and performed hundreds of songs, several of which have become group classics.  These songs, performed many times annually and recognized by students at the University of Virginia as VG signatures, include "Insomniac," by Billy Pilgrim, the group's most celebrated and acclaimed arrangement; "On the Turning Away," by Pink Floyd, performed during some of the University's most difficult times; and "Shenandoah," a Glee Club standard carried over from the groups' long history together.

"Lonesome Road"
The first and last song that each Virginia Gentleman sings during his time in the group is "Lonesome Road", by James Taylor.  At the close of each concert, the Virginia Gentlemen invite all past VGs onstage to join in its singing, and it serves as the final song on Gold, the group's 50th Anniversary Album, released in 2003.  Though the song is younger than the group, past members of the Virginia Gentlemen have since learned the arrangement and all members past and present perform the song together whenever the occasion arises.

"When We Were Young"
In 2016, the group debuted its rendition of the famous Adele track, "When We Were Young." The cover was the first of the group's to reach the one million view threshold on YouTube.

Discography

Studio Albums
Still Dancing (2019)
Upside Down (2016)
Full Attire (2014)
Guys In Ties (2012)
Rugby Road (2010)
Holiday Album (2008)
Poker Face (2006)
Based On A True Story (2004)
Gold: 50th Anniversary Compilation Album (2003)
Turning (2002)
Bizarro World (2000)
Last Call (1999)
Retrospective (1998)
Out On The Street (1997)
Void Where Prohibited (1996)
Seven and Seven (1995)
Undone (1994)
XL (1993)
High Tied (1992)
Prairie Fire (1991)
Stop, Drop, and Roll (1990)
Live From The Studio (1988)

Awards

Musical awardsContemporary A Cappella Recording Awards (CARAs)|-
|rowspan="2"| 2015 || Full Attire || Best Male Collegiate Album || 
|-
|"Demons" by Imagine Dragons || Best Male Collegiate Song || 
|-
| 2013 || "Colder Weather" by Zac Brown Band || Best Male Collegiate Solo—Andrew Fish || 
|-
|rowspan="2"| 1996 || Seven and Seven || Best Male Collegiate Album || 
|-
|"Insomniac" by Billy Pilgrim || Best Male Collegiate Song || 
|-
| 1992 || Prairie Fire || Best Male Collegiate Album (Runner-Up) || 

Selection for "best of" compilation albumsBest of College A Cappella (BOCA)|-
| 2015 || "Problem" by Ariana Grande || BOCA 2015: Best of College A Cappella || 
|-
| 2014 || "Insomniac" by Billy Pilgrim || Best of BOCA: The First 20 Years || 
|-
| 2013 || "Without You" by David Guetta ft. Usher || BOCA 2013: Best of College A Cappella || 
|-
| 1996 || "Insomniac" by Billy Pilgrim || BOCA Vol. 2: Best of College A Cappella || 
|-
| 1995 || "Ship of Fools" by Robert Plant || BOCA Vol. 1: Best of College A Cappella || Voices Only'|-
| 2013 || "Holocene" by Bon Iver || Voices Only 2013'' ||

Record of Travel

Notable alumni
Will Anderson, lead singer of Parachute (band)
Bill Bruce, former majority leader of the Tennessee Senate and 1978 U.S. Senate candidate
Michael Butterman, world-renowned conductor  
Micah Iverson, season 18 finalist on The Voice
Nate McFarland, former guitarist of Parachute (band)
Justin Rosolino, singer/songwriter 
Norman Vladimir, pop-soul artist

External links
 The Virginia Gentlemen Home Page

References

Musical groups established in 1953
University of Virginia musical groups
Albemarle County, Virginia
Charlottesville, Virginia
Virginia culture
Collegiate a cappella groups
Musical groups from Virginia
1953 establishments in Virginia